Radio Contact is the thirteenth album by Acoustic Alchemy.

Comprising thirteen tracks, led off by single "No Messin'", the album features input from fellow guitarist Chuck Loeb on two tracks.

The album is also the band's first to contain a full vocal track, "Little Laughter", performed by Jo Harrop.

The track "Ya Tebya Lubliu" was so named after the Russian phrase for "I Love You".

Track listing

Singles

 "No Messin'"

References

Acoustic Alchemy albums
2003 albums